Polly Me Love is a 1976 Australian film about a brothel owner's daughter in 1830.

The film was a ratings success and also sold to Canada, Europe and South America.

References

External links
Polly Me Love at Peter Malone
Polly Me Love at AustLit

Australian romantic drama films
1976 films
1970s English-language films
Films directed by Peter Maxwell
1970s Australian films